The Alex Salmond scandal was a political scandal in Scotland concerning the conduct of former First Minister of Scotland, Alex Salmond while in office.

There was an associated feud within the Scottish National Party (SNP) between Salmond and his supporters and Sturgeon and her supporters.

A ministerial code investigation into Sturgeon conducted by James Hamilton concluded that she did not break the ministerial code over her conduct with Salmond.

Salmond subsequently joined the Alba Party where shortly after, Kenny MacAskill and Neale Hanvey, two SNP MPs defected to the party along with several councillors.

History

In late 2017, the Scottish Government received sexual harassment complaints against Salmond, concerning his behaviour while he was First Minister.

These led to Salmond's resignation from the SNP. In response, Salmond alleged serious flaws in the Scottish Government's investigation of these allegations and launched a successful legal challenge. The Scottish Government later conceded that its procedures had been flawed and covered Salmond's legal expenses.

In January 2019, Salmond was arrested and charged with two counts of attempted rape, nine of sexual assault, two of indecent assault, and one of breach of the peace.

During the trial, the defence characterised Salmond as "touchy-feely" and acknowledged sexual contact with two of the complainants, but denied any criminality. Salmond was found not guilty on 12 charges and not proven on a further charge. One charge was dropped.

Two investigations were launched into the handling of the sexual harassment complaints against Salmond by Sturgeon and the Scottish Government. The Parliamentary Committee on the Scottish Government Handling of Harassment Complaints concluded that Sturgeon misled the Committee.

A separate independent investigation by James Hamilton into whether Sturgeon breached the Ministerial Code was released on 22 March 2021 and concluded that Sturgeon did not breach the code. The findings of both reports came shortly before elections to the Scottish Parliament in May 2021.

Background
Alex Salmond was twice leader of the Scottish National Party (SNP; 1990-2000, 2004-2014) and served as First Minister of Scotland from 2007 to 2014. After resigning in 2014, his Deputy First Minister, Nicola Sturgeon, succeeded him as First Minister and leader of the SNP.

In late 2017, the Scottish Government received complaints of sexual misconduct by Salmond. These became public some months later. In August 2018, Salmond resigned from the SNP in the face of allegations of sexual misconduct in 2013 while he was First Minister. In a statement he said that he wanted to avoid internal division within the party and intended to apply to rejoin the SNP once he had an opportunity to clear his name.

HM Advocate v Salmond

On 24 January 2019, Police Scotland arrested Salmond. He was charged with 14 offences, including two counts of attempted rape, nine of sexual assault, two of indecent assault, and one of breach of the peace.

In a High Court case, HM Advocate v Salmond, Salmond appeared in court on 21 November and entered a plea of "not guilty". The trial started on 9 March 2020.

It was alleged that Alex Salmond tried to rape a woman in Bute House after a private dinner in June 2014. She had not mentioned this incident when she first talked to police in 2018. It was further claimed that women were banned from working alone with Salmond within the Scottish civil service.

During the trial, the defence claimed that the married Mr Salmond, characterised as "touchy-feely", who admitted to sexual contact with two of the complainants, both junior to him and much younger, could act inappropriately, and led witnesses who called him "extraordinarily pugnacious" and "extremely demanding". Salmond said he wished he had been "more careful" around others' personal space.

On 23 March, Salmond was found not guilty on 12 charges, and not proven on one of sexual assault with intent to rape; one sexual assault charge was previously withdrawn by the Crown.

Judicial review
Salmond alleged serious misconduct in the Scottish Government’s handling of accusations of sexual misconduct against him. On 30 August 2018, he launched a crowdfunding appeal to pay for the legal costs of seeking a judicial review into the fairness of the process by which the Scottish Government has handled the allegations. He closed the appeal two days later, on 1 September, after raising £100,000, double the amount he wanted to pay for his legal costs.

On 8 January 2019, he won his inquiry case against Scottish Government, noting, "while I am glad about the victory which has been achieved today, I am sad that it was necessary to take this action." The Scottish Government's complaints process was ruled to be "unlawful", "procedurally unfair" and "tainted by apparent bias". The Scottish Government later conceded that its procedures had been flawed and paid Salmond’s legal expenses following the ruling. Legal bills cost the taxpayer £630,773, made up of a £512,250 settlement to Salmond from public funds for his legal costs, and the Scottish Government’s own legal costs of £118,523.

The Scottish Government admitted it breached its own guidelines by appointing an investigating officer who had "prior involvement" in the case. Salmond also asked permanent secretary to the Scottish Government, Leslie Evans, to consider her position. Evans stated that the complaints the government had received in January 2018 had not been withdrawn, so the option of re-investigating them remained on the table, once the police probe into the allegations had run its course.

Hamilton inquiry
In January 2019, Nicola Sturgeon referred herself to an independent ministerial ethics body, which led to an ongoing investigation into her actions with respect to a sexual harassment case concerning allegations against Salmond. This followed her admitting that she had a secret meeting and subsequent phone call with Salmond about the Scottish government's allegations against him. She raised these with the Permanent Secretary to the Scottish Government, Leslie Evans, two months later, rather than reporting them immediately, as she should if they constitute government matters (as per the Ministerial Code). Sturgeon argued that the meetings were SNP party matters, and thus not covered.

The investigating panel consisted of Dame Elish Angiolini, a former Solicitor General for Scotland and lord advocate, and James Hamilton, a former director of public prosecutions in the Republic of Ireland. Hamilton was investigating whether Sturgeon breached the ministerial code in her role in the Scottish Government's investigation into sexual harassment complaints made against Salmond. This was paused in 2019 and resumed in August 2020. On 22 March 2021, his report was published, concluding that Sturgeon did not breach the ministerial code.

Parliamentary inquiry

On 15 January 2019 the Scottish Parliament agreed to hold its own inquiry into the matter. The Scottish Parliament set up the Committee on the Scottish Government Handling of Harassment Complaints to investigate how the Government breached its own guidelines in its original investigation into the harassment claims against Salmond, and then lost a judicial review into their actions and had to pay over £500,000 to Salmond for legal expenses. A political row developed over what evidence to this committee Salmond could present.

First Minister Nicola Sturgeon initially told parliament that she had first heard of the complaints against Salmond when he told her of them on 2 April 2018. However, 18 months later, she revised her account, saying she had forgotten about an earlier meeting, on 29 March 2018, in which Salmond's former chief of staff Geoff Aberdein told her about the complaints. Critics have described this as a possible breach of the ministerial code, which states that any minister who deliberately misleads parliament should resign. The 29 March meeting was not recorded: meetings on government business are meant to be recorded, but Sturgeon has said this is because it was an SNP meeting.

Sturgeon's husband, Peter Murrell, was called to this inquiry to give evidence on 8 December 2020. Opposition parties criticised Sturgeon on disparity and contradictions between the narratives of Murrell and herself.

Giving evidence in person in February 2021, Salmond claimed that senior figures in the Scottish Government and the SNP plotted to remove him from public life and to send him to prison. In his evidence to the committee, Salmond said there was "no doubt" that Sturgeon had broken the ministerial code in not revealing the 29 March meeting sooner and in not recording what was really a meeting about government business. Sturgeon denies any wrongdoing and disputes Salmond's allegations.

Documents and emails published on 2 March 2021 showed that two people supported Salmond's assertion that the meeting was convened as a government, not party, matter. The publication also backed up Salmond's allegation that the identity of one of his accusers had been passed to his former chief of staff, contradicting Sturgeon's statement that "to the very best of my knowledge I do not think that happened". They also confirmed that the government had pursued the legal case against Salmond after being advised by lawyers that it was likely to fail. On 19 March 2021, it was reported that a majority of MSPs on the Alex Salmond committee voted to affirm that Nicola Sturgeon misled the inquiry.

References 

Alex Salmond
Political scandals in Scotland
Scottish National Party